The Wembley Cup was an invitational football tournament. The only edition for professional teams was the first edition of the tournament which took place between 24 and 26 July 2009 at Wembley Stadium, Wembley Park, London, United Kingdom. The winning team was Celtic, ahead of Barcelona, Tottenham Hotspur, and Al Ahly. Each team played two matches, with three points awarded for a win and one point for a draw. Each goal was rewarded with a point and each one conceded saw a point deducted.

Wembley Cup 2009

Standings

Goalscorers

Subsequent tournaments 
In the last match of the inaugural Wembley Cup (2009) it was announced that the success of the tournament had encouraged organisers to confirm a second edition of the competition in the summer of 2010. However the 2010 tournament did not take place and the Wembley Cup has not been staged again for professional teams.

References

External links 
 

2009–10 in English football
2009–10 in Scottish football
2009–10 in Spanish football
2009–10 in Egyptian football
International club association football competitions hosted by London
English football friendly trophies
Events at Wembley Stadium
Football cup competitions in England